Cabe-Pratt-Harris House, also known as Riverland Farm, is a historic home located near Hillsborough, Orange County, North Carolina.  It was built about 1820, and is a -story, Late Georgian style frame dwelling with a gable roof.  It sits on a raised fieldstone foundation and has flanking stone chimneys with brick stacks.  It has a rear addition built in the 1940s, and was renovated in the 1980s.

It was listed on the National Register of Historic Places in 1999.

References

Houses on the National Register of Historic Places in North Carolina
Georgian architecture in North Carolina
Houses completed in 1820
Hillsborough, North Carolina
Houses in Orange County, North Carolina
National Register of Historic Places in Orange County, North Carolina